At Carnegie Hall may refer to:
The Weavers at Carnegie Hall, a 1957 release of a 1955 Weavers concert recording
Thelonious Monk Quartet with John Coltrane at Carnegie Hall, a 1957 concert recording
Belafonte at Carnegie Hall, a 1959 Harry Belafonte album
Odetta at Carnegie Hall, a 1960 live album by Odetta
Jimmy Reed at Carnegie Hall, a 1961 release by Jimmy Reed
Judy at Carnegie Hall, a 1961 Judy Garland concert recording
Miles Davis at Carnegie Hall, released in 1961 by Miles Davis
At Carnegie Hall (Dave Brubeck Quartet album), a 1963 album by the Dave Brubeck Quartet
Chicago at Carnegie Hall, a 1971 album by Chicago
At Carnegie Hall (Liza Minnelli album), a 1987 Liza Minnelli album
At Carnegie Hall, a 1988 live album by Pavarotti
At Carnegie Hall, a 1992 live album by Kathleen Battle
Buena Vista Social Club at Carnegie Hall, a 2008 live album of a 1998 Buena Vista Social Club performance

You may be looking for
 The Famous 1938 Carnegie Hall Jazz Concert a concert given by Benny Goodman and others

See also
Live at Carnegie Hall (disambiguation)
Carnegie Hall Concert (disambiguation)